Massena may refer to:
 
André Masséna, French-Italian military commander during the Revolutionary and Napoleonic Wars
François Victor Massena, 3rd Duke of Rivoli, French nobleman and ornithologist, son of André Masséna
French battleship Masséna, a French pre-dreadnought battleship
Massena, New York, a town in New York, United States, named after the commander
Massena (village), New York, partly located in the Town of Massena
Massena, Iowa, a city in Iowa, United States, named after Massena, New York
Alternative transliteration of Masinissa (c. 240 or 238-c. 148 BC), ancient Numidian king